Braden Barty (born July 24, 1970) is an American director and producer, whose work includes most notably Far Away Eyes, Spirit Space (2008) and Flipping Vegas. He is also owner and founder of Braden Barty Media based in Burbank, California.

Biography

Early life
Barty was born in Los Angeles and raised in North Hollywood. His father, Billy Barty was an American film actor, entertainer and activist and one of the most famous 20th century people with dwarfism. His mother (also a dwarf), Shirley Bolingbroke, was a graphic design artist and a graduate from the California Institute of Arts. He was born above average height and stands 5' 11".

Career
Barty is a film graduate from the University of Utah. After graduating from college in 1996, Barty returned to Los Angeles to pursue a career in Hollywood. For three years he worked as an assistant director on low-budget films and TV shows.

His 1996 film documentary, Far Away Eyes: A Portrait of Autism, won first place at the Utah Film Front Festival and was sold to video distributor Chip Taylor Communications.

He has worked with behind the scenes videos with various artists such as Fall Out Boy, Lionel Richie, Foo Fighters, Jennifer Lopez, Mariah Carey, Ne-Yo, The O.C. Supertones, Rihanna, Thrice, Deftones. His latest music video he directed himself was for American Idol star, Brooke White's song "Free".

In 2006 Barty teamed up with three-time WCW Champion Diamond Dallas Page and co-produced and directed his successful seven set YRG workout videos.

In 2005, Barty began shooting a metaphysical documentary, Spirit Space. The film is based on quantum physics, life after death and the realities of consciousness. In March 2008 the film, featuring Fred Alan Wolf, Edgar Mitchell, and Don Miguel Ruiz was released.

In 2010 Barty produced two TV pilots, Flipping Vegas and Girls Gone Global. He is in the development stages of another film, Multiverse, which is being dubbed as the sequel to his successful film Spirit Space.

Personal life
He is an active member of the Church of Jesus Christ of Latter-day Saints. He served a two-year mission in Salvador, Brazil from 1990 to 1992. Barty currently resides in La Crescenta, California with his wife Michelle and sons Jonah and Ashton. He is fluent in Spanish, Portuguese, and Italian, and studied Hebrew.

References

External links

1970 births
Living people
Film producers from California
People from Los Angeles
University of Utah alumni
20th-century Mormon missionaries
American Mormon missionaries in Brazil
People from La Crescenta-Montrose, California
Latter Day Saints from California